General Roca is a city in the northeast of the Argentine province of Río Negro, northern Patagonia. It was founded on September 1, 1879, by Colonel Lorenzo Vintter, on the order of War Minister Julio A. Roca, during the Conquest of the Desert. The place of the first settlement was known by native mapuche people as Fiske Menuco, which means "deep water".

Its present population is approximately 86,000 (according to ), making it the second most populated city in the province after Bariloche, and the second most important in the Alto Valle after Neuquén. The main activity around the city is the intensive agriculture under irrigation, which made possible an intense agro-industrial activity. The main crops are pears and apples. The city hosts the annual National Festival of the Apple, which is held in early February.

The city is connected to the east by Argentine National Route 22, and is also crossed by provincial routes 6 and 65, which connect it to other cities in the Alto Valle, with the south of the province, and with the La Pampa Province. Through the centre of the city drives the wide rail train lane that joins Zapala with Bahía Blanca and Buenos Aires. The local airport connects General Roca with other points of the country, mainly with Buenos Aires and Mendoza. Nonetheless, due to lack of maintenance, the airport has not been used since the year 2000.

Together with Villa Regina, Allen, Cinco Saltos, Cipolletti, Neuquén and many other smaller towns, they constitute the lineal urbanization of the Alto Valle of the Negro River. The city is surrounded by a patchwork of irrigated land totaling . Besides apple and pear orchards, there are vineyards and other establishments producing peaches and a variety of other fruits and vegetables. Within the industrial sector, the fruit-refrigerating storehouses, fruit and vegetable packaging, and other agriculture-related industries stand out.

Tourist attractions

"Old Town" 

The place of the first settlement where General Roca was founded, near Río Negro shoreline, is known as "Old Town". Several buildings dating back to the time before the flooding and subsequent move of the town can be still visited:

 San Miguel School
 María Auxiliadora Sanctuary
 Old María Auxiliadora School
 Villegas Square
 Stefenelli Train Station

2016 meteor event

In the afternoon of 20 June 2016, a series of loud blasts could be heard in General Roca, causing buildings to shake and windows to rattle, but police, firefighters and emergency workers could not find any evidence of an explosion or natural calamity. No damage was reported.

Climate
General Roca has a semi-arid climate with warm to hot summers, combined with cool winters. Rainfall is sparse year round, resulting in a relative arid influence of the climate, being located in the Andean rain shadow.

References

External links 
Municipality of General Roca (Spanish)
General Roca at RocaPortal

Populated places in Río Negro Province
Populated places established in 1879
Cities in Argentina
Argentina
Río Negro Province